Guy Adams (born 6 January 1976) is an English author, comedian, and actor, possibly best known for the novel The World House. Adams is also a regular writer for Big Finish productions, who produce audio plays based on Doctor Who, as well as several other properties.

Biography
Adams has also written several books for the Doctor Who franchise, including the BBC Books Torchwood novel, The House That Jack Built. Adams's second book in his The Heaven's Gate Chronicles series, entitled Once Upon Time in Hell was published on 31 December 2013.   The first book was also published in 2013 and was entitled The Good, The Bad and the Infernal.

He starred as a mugger on British soap opera, Emmerdale and has also tried stand-up with his own material. Adams has also portrayed Sherlock Holmes before embarking on creating his own original novel featuring Holmes.

Bibliography

Clown Service
 The Clown Service (2013)
 The Rain Soaked Bride (2014)
 A Few Words for the Dead (2015)

Doctor Who franchise
 Torchwood: The House that Jack Built (2009)
 Torchwood: The Men Who Sold the World (2011)
 Class: Joyride (2016)

Heaven's Gate
The Good, The Bad, and The Infernal (2013)
Once Upon a Time in Hell (2013)
For a Few More Souls (2014)

Life on Mars franchise
 The Rules of Modern Policing (2007)
 The Wit and Wisdom of DCI Gene Hunt (2009)

Sherlock Holmes franchise
 The Case Notes of Sherlock Holmes (2009)
 Sherlock Holmes: The Breath of God (2012)
 Sherlock Holmes: The Army of Dr. Moreau (2013)

The Change
London: Orbital (2017)
New York: Queen of Coney Island (2017)
Paris: City of Fools (2017)

The World House
 The World House (2010)
 The World House: Restoration (2011)

Standalone works
 Deadbeat: Makes You Stronger (2005)
 The Curse of the Werewolf (2009)
 Kronos (2011)
 Hands of the Ripper (2012)
 Countess Dracula (2013)

Non-fiction
 Stranger Things: Notes from the Upside Down (2017)

Audio plays

For Big Finish Productions

Doctor Who – Main Range
Fiesta of the Damned
Dalek Soul
The Quantum Possibility Engine
Conversion
Dark Universe

Doctor Who – Novel Adaptations 
All-Consuming Fire (adapted from the novel by Andy Lane)

The Tenth Doctor Adventures
Sword of the Chevalier

The Tenth Doctor Chronicles
Last Chance

The First Doctor Adventures
The Great White Hurricane
Tick-Tock World
For the Glory of Urth

The Third Doctor Adventures
The Transcendence of Ephros
The Rise of the New Humans
The Scream of Ghosts
Operation Hellfire

The Fourth Doctor Adventures
Kill The Doctor!
The Age of Sutekh
The False Guardian
Time's Assassin
The World Traders
The Dreams of Avarice
Ice Heist!

The Eighth Doctor – The Time War
In the Garden of Death

The War Doctor
Pretty Lies

The War Master
The Heavenly Paradigm
The Persistence of Dreams 
Sins of the Father

The Diary of River Song
The Unknown
Peepshow

Torchwood
More Than This
Moving Target
Made You Look
Outbreak – Stage 1: Incubation:Know
Believe
We Always Get Out Alive

The Lives of Captain Jack
The Year After I Died
Month 25
Crush

UNIT: The New Series
Tidal Wave
Retrieval
Telepresence
Code Silver
The Power of River Song Part 1
The Power of River Song Part 2

The New Adventures of Bernice Summerfield
Random Ghosts
The Pyramid of Sutekh
Planet X
The City and the Clock
Truant
Gallifrey

The New Counter-Measures
Nothing to See Here

The Robots
Circuit Breaker
Closed Loop

The Companion Chronicles
The Plague of Dreams
The Crumbling Magician (from The First Doctor Volume 3)

Iris Wildthyme
Iris Rides Out

Vienna
Big Society
Retribution

Blake's 7: The Liberator Chronicles
Capital
Punishment

Star Cops
The Thousand Ton Bomb

Adam Adamant Lives!
Vol.01: A Vintage Year for Scoundrels
Vol.02: Face Off

The Confessions of Dorian Gray
One Must Not Look at Mirrors

Big Finish Classics
The Shape of Things to Come (based on the book by H. G. Wells)

Big Finish Originals
Blind Terror: The Gods of Frost

References

External resources
 REVIEW : The Clown Service at Upcoming4.me
 The story behind The Rain-Soaked Bride – Online Essay by Guy Adams at Upcoming4.me

1976 births
Living people
21st-century English novelists
21st-century English male writers
English male novelists
English dramatists and playwrights
Place of birth missing (living people)
English male dramatists and playwrights
British science fiction writers
Writers of Doctor Who novels